Gregory Lomayesva (born 1971 -) is an internationally recognized painter, sculptor and mixed-media artist who lives and works in Santa Fe, New Mexico. He draws imagery and ideas from his Hopi and Hispanic heritage and American popular culture.

Contemporary woodwork 
A painter since his mid-teens, Lomayesva's career began when he combined his woodworking skills with the classical imagery of his Hopi heritage into fusion artifacts that rapidly developed a strong collector base and wide acclaim. Beginning with the masks and dolls that are staples of his historical folk-craft tradition, Lomayesva quickly built a recognizable visual lexicon all his own that he was eventually able to bring to large-scale works of wood, bronze, and steel.

The paintings 

Expanding his output to include large-scale painting, Lomayesva began dipping into the contemporary zeitgeist of sampling and appropriation and took his audiences along on a journey to understand the totality of his influences, from Hopi imagery to popular culture icons to the works of the Renaissance masters.

Exploring painting styles of the past, he began appropriating classical images from art history, scanning images from art books, then finding a section to explore further in his own work. Using an innovative photo-emulsion process, Lomayesva would capture the projection of the chosen image on canvass, then begin the process of layering meaning into his canvasses by juxtaposing these lush silver-gelatin images with rich abstract brush strokes, silk-screened pop culture logos, and Hopi iconography from his own rich visual vocabulary.

In the process, Lomayesva created hundreds of canvas works of exquisite beauty, thoughtfulness and emotion, inviting audiences to view an inclusive art history built on indigenous ideas and iconography, popular imagery, and the established history of European classicism.

Music and electronics 

In addition to his fine art paintings, Lomayesva has produced two complete albums of electronic pop music on his label Drip Records, produced several short films, and recently "cloned" an out-of-production music vocal compression circuit board from the 1950s for his own use and for sale as a limited edition functional art piece to electronic music composers. With his developing skills in music, video, film, electronics, and other New Media, Lomayesva produced his first environment at Site Santa Fe in December, and has more installation projects planned for the future.

Today, Lomayesva boasts a body of work that includes thousands of canvasses, woodcraft artifacts, and other ephemera.  He's currently working on a new body of work that will combine elements of Op-Art and portraiture.

Selected solo exhibitions 
 2008 "Muse" at Gebert Contemporary, Los Angeles
 2008 "Bounce" at Ursa Gallery, Santa Fe
 2006 "More Indian" at Winterrowd Fine Art, Santa Fe
 2006 "The Art of War" at Art & Industry, Santa Fe
 2005 "You Can Breathe Now" at J. Cacciola gallery, New York
 2005 "Flutter" Washington DC
 2005 "Untitled" at Chiaroscuro Gallery, Scottsdale
 2004 "untitled" at J Cacciola Gallery, New York
 2004 "16:9" at Peyton Wright Gallery, Santa Fe
 2003 "Bent" at Peyton Wright Gallery, Santa Fe
 2003 "Swoon" at Chiaroscuro Gallery, Scottsdale
 2002 "Curves Ahead" at Peyton Wright Gallery, in Santa Fe
 2001 "Common bonds" at Peyton Wright Gallery, in Santa Fe
 2000 STAP project, in Florence, Italy
 1999  "New Works" at Bryans Gallery, Taos, NM
 1998 Southwest Museum in Los Angeles

Living people
1971 births
20th-century American painters
21st-century American sculptors
American people of Native American descent
21st-century American painters
20th-century American sculptors